Robert Barney Dallenbach (born August 6, 1927) is a bishop in the Pillar of Fire International.  He also was the church's fifth general superintendent until losing a vote of confidence at the 2008  Pillar of Fire annual camp meeting convention. He also served as a director for the North Metro Arts Alliance in Colorado. He was the author of seven books.

Biography
He was born on August 6, 1927 and is the brother of CART driver Wally Dallenbach Sr.

He pastored at the Alma Temple in Westminster, Colorado, and he served as president of Belleview College and was the general manager of Christian radio AM 910, KPOF.

He married Pauline White (1927-2019) in 1949. They have two children: Alma Beth Walker, and Joel. Pauline is the daughter of Arthur Kent White, and the granddaughter of Alma Bridwell White, the founder of the church.

Dallenbach succeeded Donald Justin Wolfram when he retired in the summer of 2000.

References

Pillar of Fire International
Living people
1927 births
Alma White College alumni